The  (literally "Central Massif") is a highland region in south-central France, consisting of mountains and plateaus. It covers about 15% of mainland France.

The region was a barrier to transport within France until the opening of the A75 motorway, which not only made north–south travel easier, but also opened access to the massif itself.

Geography and geology 

The  is an old massif, formed during the Variscan orogeny, consisting mostly of granitic and metamorphic rocks. It was powerfully raised and made to look geologically younger in the eastern section by the uplift of the Alps during the Paleogene period and in the southern section by the uplift of the Pyrenees.

These tectonic movements created faults and may be at the origin of the volcanism in the massif (but the hypothesis is not proved yet). In fact, above the crystalline foundation, one can observe many volcanoes of many different types and ages: volcanic plateaus (Aubrac, Cézallier), stratovolcanoes (Mounts of Cantal), and small, very recent monogenic volcanoes. The entire region contains a large concentration of around 450 extinct volcanoes. The Auvergne Volcanoes regional natural park is in the massif. The amusement park of Vulcania near Clermont-Ferrand allows visitors to discover this natural heritage and introduces them to volcanology.

In the south, one remarkable region, made up of features called  in French, consists of raised limestone plateaus cut by very deep canyons. The most famous of these is the Gorges du Tarn (canyon of the Tarn).

Mountains
Mountain ranges, with notable individual mountains, are (roughly north to south):

 
 Puy de Dôme
 Puy de Pariou
 Puy de Lassolas
 Puy de la Vache
 
 Puy de Sancy
 Monts du Lyonnais
 Pilat massif
 Crêt de la Perdrix
 Mounts of Cantal
 Plomb du Cantal
 Puy Mary
 Forez
 Pierre-sur-Haute
 
 Signal de Mailhebiau
 Margeride
 Signal de Randon
 Mont Mouchet
 
 
 Mont Gerbier de Jonc
 Cévennes
 Mont Lozère, the highest non-volcanic summit
 , near Le Vigan, Florac
 Monts de Lacaune
 Montgrand
 Monts de l'Espinouse
 Sommet de l'Espinouse
 Montagne Noire
 Pic de Nore

Plateaus

 
 
 Plateau de Lévézou
 Causse du Comtal
 Causse de Sauveterre
 Causse de Sévérac
 Causse Méjean
 Causse Noir
 Causse de Blandas

Administration

Economy

The other industries present are linked to agriculture (Groupe Limagrain, the world's third-largest seed producer, cheese-producing industries that export to the world, such as Cantal and Roquefort).

On the agricultural level, the  plain is dominated by major cereal crops, but in the mountains, it is mainly livestock farming that predominates: cattle farming in the west for meat and milk (Cantal cheese), sheep farming in the south on the limestone plateaus (Roquefort cheese).

The entire economy of the  has benefited from the opening of roads, in particular the construction of the A75 motorway (on which is located the famous Millau Viaduct).

See also
 Geography of France

References

External links 
 

 
Highlands
Landforms of Auvergne-Rhône-Alpes
Landforms of Occitania (administrative region)
Mountain passes of Auvergne-Rhône-Alpes
Mountain ranges of Auvergne-Rhône-Alpes
Mountain ranges of Occitania (administrative region)
Physiographic provinces
Volcanoes of Metropolitan France